Caloptilia koelreutericola is a moth of the family Gracillariidae. It is known from Beijing, China.

The larvae feed on Koelreuteria paniculata. They mine the leaves of their host plant.

References

koelreutericola
Moths of Asia
Moths described in 1990